Augusto Rodrigues Coutinho de Melo (born 22 October 1962) more commonly known as Augusto Coutinho is a Brazilian politician as well as a civil engineer. He has spent his political career representing Pernambuco, having served as state representative since 2011.

Early life
Coutinho was born to Henoch Coutinho de Melo and Carmen Rodrigues Coutinho de Melo. Before entering politics Coutinho worked as a civil engineer.

Political career
Coutinho voted in favor of the impeachment motion of then-president Dilma Rousseff. He would later vote against opening a similar corruption investigation into Rousseff's successor Michel Temer, and voted in favor of the 2017 Brazilian labor reforms.

In January 2019 Coutinho was appointed leader of the Solidariedade party in the Brazilian legislature.

References

1962 births
Living people
Politicians from Recife
Brazilian civil engineers
Solidariedade politicians
Democrats (Brazil) politicians
Members of the Chamber of Deputies (Brazil) from Pernambuco
Members of the Legislative Assembly of Pernambuco